Ricky Glaser (born 12 October 1991) is a regular-footed professional skateboarder from Melbourne, Australia.

Career 
Glaser began skating at age 8. He is known for performing unique and crazy skateboarding tricks. Glaser set a Guinness World Record for the  Most skateboard kickflips in one minute in April 2012 where he performed 36 kickflips.

In August 2020, Glaser moved to the United States and joined the Braille Skateboarding Team.

References 

1991 births
Living people
Australian skateboarders
Sportspeople from Melbourne